Ruturaj Patil also known as Ruturaj Sanjay Patil, is an Indian Politician from Kolhapur District. He is the Member of the Maharashtra Legislative Assembly from Kolhapur South. He is the Grandson of the D. Y. Patil.

Personal life 
He is the son of renowned educationalist Dr. Sanjay D Patil and grandson of former Governor of Tripura and West Bengal, Padmashree D. Y. Patil, Founder Chairman of the D Y Patil Education Institutes. Member of the Legislative Council, he follows Mr. Satej D Patil, which reflects in his leadership quality and dynamism. He has conceptualized and helped in the construction of the city's first 5-star luxury hotel named as 'Sayaji', the city's largest retail mall, and the city's best wellness facilities.

After completing his MBA from Welingkar Institute of Management, Mr. Ruturaj Patil graduated with his global business certification from Lehigh University, Pennsylvania, U.S.

References

Members of the Maharashtra Legislative Council
People from Kolhapur district
Marathi politicians
1990 births
Living people